The Women's Team Sprint is one of the 7 women's events at the 2007 UCI Track World Championship, held in Palma de Mallorca, Spain.

Eleven teams of two cyclists each participated in the contest. After the qualifying, the fastest two teams raced for gold, and 3rd and 4th teams raced for bronze.

The Qualifying and the Finals were held on the evening session on March 29.

Qualifying

Finals

References

Women's team sprint
UCI Track Cycling World Championships – Women's team sprint
UCI